Clapboard, also called bevel siding, lap siding, and weatherboard, with regional variation in the definition of these terms, is wooden siding of a building in the form of horizontal boards, often overlapping.

Clapboard, in modern American usage, is a word for long, thin boards used to cover walls and (formerly) roofs of buildings. Historically, it has also been called clawboard and cloboard. In the United Kingdom, Australia and New Zealand, the term weatherboard is always used.

Types

Riven
Clapboards were originally riven radially by hand producing triangular or "feather-edged" sections, attached thin side up and overlapped thick over thin to shed water.

Radially sawn
Later, the boards were radially sawn in a type of sawmill called a clapboard mill, producing vertical-grain clapboards. The more commonly used boards in New England are vertical-grain boards. Each time the log turns for the next cut, it is rotated  until it has turned 360°. This gives the radially sawn clapboard its taper and true vertical grain.

Flat-sawn
Flat-grain clapboards are cut tangent to the annual growth rings of the tree. As this technique was common in most parts of the British Isles, it was carried by immigrants to their colonies in the Americas and in Australia and New Zealand. Flat-sawn wood cups more and does not hold paint as well as radially sawn wood.

Chamferboard
Chamferboards are an Australian form of weatherboarding using tongue-and-groove joints to link the boards together to give a flatter external appearance than regular angled weatherboards.

Finger jointed
Some modern clapboards are made up of shorter pieces of wood finger jointed together with an adhesive.

Wood species

In North America clapboards were historically made of split oak, pine and spruce. Modern clapboards are available in red cedar and pine.

In some areas, clapboards were traditionally left as raw wood, relying upon good air circulation and the use of 'semi-hardwoods' to keep the boards from rotting. These boards eventually go grey as the tannins are washed out from the wood. More recently clapboard has been tarred or painted—traditionally black or white due to locally occurring minerals or pigments. In modern clapboard these colors remain popular, but with a hugely wider variety due to chemical pigments and stains.

Clapboard houses may be found in most parts of the British Isles, and the style may be part of all types of traditional building, from cottages to windmills, shops to workshops, as well as many others.

In New Zealand, clapboard housing dominates buildings before 1960. Clapboard, with a corrugated iron roof, was found to be a cost-effective building style. After the big earthquakes of 1855 and 1931, wooden buildings were perceived as being less vulnerable to damage. Clapboard is always referred to as weatherboard in New Zealand.

Newer, cheaper designs often imitate the form of clapboard construction as siding made of vinyl (uPVC), aluminum, fiber cement, or other man-made materials. These materials can provide a lightweight alternative to wooden cladding.

See also 
 Clinker (boat building)
 Shiplap
 Siding § Wood siding
 Tongue and groove

References

External links
Research report containing photos of a clapboard roof in Virginia, U.S.A.

Building materials
House styles
Wood products